Bao Zhenmin (born 27 December 1961) is a Chinese marine biologist who is dean of the Marine Life Sciences School, Ocean University of China, and an academician of the Chinese Academy of Engineering.

Biography 
Bao was born in Yantai, Shandong, on 27 December 1961. After high school, he studied, then taught, at what is now the Ocean University of China. In 1997, he earned his doctor's degree in aquaculture science from Qingdao University of Oceanology (now Ocean University of China). In December 1997, he became deputy dean of the Marine Life Sciences School, Ocean University of China, rising to dean in 2011.

Honours and awards 
 2001 State Science and Technology Progress Award (Second Class) 
 2008 State Science and Technology Progress Award (Second Class) 
 2015 State Science and Technology Progress Award (Second Class) 
 27 November 2017 Member of the Chinese Academy of Engineering (CAE)
 2018 State Technological Invention Award (Second Class)

References 

1961 births
Living people
People from Yantai
Engineers from Shandong
Ocean University of China alumni
Academic staff of Ocean University of China
Chinese biologists
Members of the Chinese Academy of Engineering